Suerococha (possibly from Quechua suyru a very long dress  tracked after when worn, qucha lake,) is a lake in the south of the Huallanca mountain range in the Andes of Peru. Suerococha is located in the Ancash Region, Bolognesi Province, Huallanca District.

References 

Lakes of Peru
Lakes of Ancash Region